is a single by Japanese singer-songwriter Rina Aiuchi. It was released on 17 December 2008 through Giza Studio, as the second single from her seventh studio album Thanx. The double A-side single reached number eight in Japan and has sold over 12,383 copies nationwide. "Friend" served as the theme song for the Japanese television show Ongaku Senshi ~Music Fighter~.

Track listing

Charts

Certification and sales

|-
! scope="row"| Japan (RIAJ)
| 
| 12,383 
|-
|}

Release history

References

2008 singles
2008 songs
J-pop songs
Song recordings produced by Daiko Nagato